Coryphantha robustispina, the Pima pineapple cactus, is a federally protected cactus of the Sonoran Desert. It is commonly found in Pima County, Arizona although it is also found throughout New Mexico and as far east as Texas.

Etymology
The generic name Coryphantha is derived from the Greek--coryphe="head",  anthos="flower"; that is to say the plant with a flower on its head.  Robustispina means robust spines and needles.

Taxonomy
Coryphantha robustispina was described by (Schott ex Engelm) Britton & Rose and published in The Cactaceae, descriptions and illustrations of plants of the cactus family.  4:33, 1923

Subspecies: Coryphantha robustispina subsp. robustispina, Coryphantha robustispina subsp. sheeri; Coryphantha robustispina subsp. uncinata.

Description

Coryphantha robustispina grows mostly solitarily with an ovoid shape.  It has a clean greyish-greenish color and reaches 5–9 cm tall and 5–15 cm in diameter although larger plants are frequently found.  The areolas are oval or cylindrical in shape with a deep furrow and one or two nectar glads.  It has 1-4 central spines curved or hooked.  They are white or grey with the tip being darker.  They measure between 1 and 5 cm in length.  The 6-16 radial spines are off-white between 1 and 3 cm in length.  Their flowers are golden yellow, pale green or opaque yellow.  The seed pods are cylindrical and green up to 5 cm.

Distribution and habitat
Coryphantha robustispina is found in Arizona, New Mexico and Texas in the United States.  It also is in Mexico in the states of Chihuahua and Sonora.  It is rare.  It is on the Federal Endangered Species list.

Ecology
Coryphantha robustispina has a complicated life cycle:

1) It flowers after a monsoon rain, usually in July.
2) A certain type of bee fertilizes it a couple of days later since the flowers only last a short time. 
3) The pods must be eaten by a jack rabbit, though not a cottontail as the cottontail's teeth will damage the seeds.
4) The seeds go through the intestines of the jack rabbit and are deposited on the ground in its excrement;  and
5) The scat protects the seeds until a special termite eats them and causes the seeds to germinate and then to propagate.

It is an extremely complicated life cycle and if any one of the steps is interrupted, the plant does not reproduce.

While the above is a typical cycle for the species, seeds collected directly from fruits and not subjected to passing through the intestines of a jackrabbit or other animal can have a high germination rate and be successfully grown into mature plants.

References
 http://swbiodiversity.org/seinet/taxa/index.php?taxon=Coryphantha%20robustispina
 https://web.archive.org/web/20131214075047/http://www.pima.gov/CMO/SDCP/species/fsheets/ppc.html

External links

robustispina
Cacti of the United States
Flora of Arizona
Flora of New Mexico
Flora of the Sonoran Deserts
Flora of Texas